Reyhna Malhotra is an Indian actress who works in Hindi films and TV shows.

Filmography

Television

Films

Music videos

References

External links
 

Living people
Indian film actresses
Indian television actresses
Actresses in Hindi cinema
Actresses from Mumbai
21st-century Indian actresses
Year of birth missing (living people)